Rhyothemis graphiptera, known as the graphic flutterer or banded flutterer, is a species of dragonfly of the family Libellulidae.
It is found across northern Australia, the Moluccas, New Guinea and New Caledonia. Rhyothemis extends from Africa to the western Pacific.

The flight of the genus Rhyothemis is usually fluttering. Rhyothemis graphiptera, a medium-sized dragonfly (wingspan 70mm, length 35mm), inhabits lagoons, lakes, ponds and swamps. The abdomen is dark and the wings are brownish-yellow with dark mottled markings. 
The taxon has been assessed for the IUCN Red List as being of least concern, and is noted in the Catalog of Life.

Gallery

See also
 List of Odonata species of Australia

References

Libellulidae
Odonata of Australia
Odonata of Oceania
Odonata of Asia
Insects of Asia
Insects of Indonesia
Insects of Southeast Asia
Insects of New Caledonia
Taxa named by Jules Pierre Rambur
Insects described in 1842